Allway Sync is backup and file synchronization software that allows backing up and synchronizing files to the same or different drives, to different media (CD, DVD, Flash, zip), or to a remote server.

Features
Like Super Flexible File Synchronizer, GoodSync and Unison File Synchronizer, it has the capability to remember the previous state of directories in a database, and thus also synchronize deletions.
It can synchronize more than two directories at once.
It can update and back-up files over a local network or the Internet, although the functionality of FTP support is debated 
Support for many file systems, like FAT, NTFS, SAMBA, NetWare, CDFS, and UDF.
Includes a scheduler.
File masks and filters.

Versions
There are various versions. Users of the freeware version are requested to buy the pro version if they use the software for a commercial purpose or to synchronize more than 40,000 files in 30-day period. This pro version has exactly the same functionality as the free version.
Allway sync (freeware version)
Allway sync Pro (for use in businesses, governments military and other enterprise environments. Removes the 40,000 files/month limitation)
Allway Sync 'n' Go (For USB and other removable drives)
Allway Sync 'n' Go U3 (For U3-enabled flash devices)
Allway Sync 'n' Go in Portable Application Format (for USB sticks)

Future
As of January 1. 2023, Allway Sync has become a part of GoodSync. The development and support for Allway Sync will also be discontinued. (Information from support.) Allway Sync customers can migrate to GoodSync by creating an account on GoodSync's website, using the same eMail address that was used for Allway Sync registration. However, Allway Sync already installed as well as pro license will keep working.

See also
Backup
List of backup software
Disk image
Comparison of disc image software
File synchronization
Comparison of file synchronization software

References

External links
http://www.allwaysync.com/

Backup software